Manila Flamini (born 18 September 1987) is an Italian synchronised swimmer.

Flamini an athlete of the Gruppo Sportivo Fiamme Oro.

Career
In November 2014, FINA officially approved of adding mixed-gender events in Synchronized swimming and diving under its banner after a vote at the Extraordinary Congress in Doha Qatar.

At the 2015 World Aquatics Championships in Kazan, Flamini represented Italy at the inaugural Mixed Duet in synchronized swimming, she won a bronze medal with duet partner Giorgio Minisini in mixed Duet technical.

References

External links
 
 
 
 
 Manila Flamini at Federnuoto.it
 Manila Flamini at The-Sports.org

1987 births
Living people
Italian synchronized swimmers
Olympic synchronized swimmers of Italy
Synchronized swimmers at the 2016 Summer Olympics
World Aquatics Championships medalists in synchronised swimming
Synchronized swimmers at the 2005 World Aquatics Championships
Synchronized swimmers at the 2007 World Aquatics Championships
Synchronized swimmers at the 2009 World Aquatics Championships
Synchronized swimmers at the 2011 World Aquatics Championships
Synchronized swimmers at the 2013 World Aquatics Championships
Synchronized swimmers at the 2015 World Aquatics Championships
Synchronized swimmers at the 2017 World Aquatics Championships
Artistic swimmers at the 2019 World Aquatics Championships
European Aquatics Championships medalists in synchronised swimming
European Championships (multi-sport event) silver medalists
Artistic swimmers of Fiamme Oro
People from Velletri
Sportspeople from the Metropolitan City of Rome Capital